James Tardy (between 1773 and 1787 – 1835) was an Irish naturalist.

Tardy was a friend of Thomas Coulter and Nicholas Aylward Vigors. His collection of 10,000 Irish insects was purchased by Trinity College in 1843. He published nothing himself, but his records appear in other works, notably by Alexander Henry Haliday and Authur Riky Hogan.

References
J.A. Good & M. Linne  1990 The History of the Early Nineteenth Century Coleoptera Collection of James Tardy at Trinity College, Dublin, and the Validity of Records based on his Collection, Irish Naturalists' Journal, 23(8), pp. 298–305.

Year of birth uncertain
1835 deaths
Irish entomologists